The Department of Wildlife and National Parks of Peninsular Malaysia, abbreviated PERHILITAN, is a governmental organisation that is responsible for the protection, management and preservation of wildlife and national parks in Peninsular Malaysia.

The department was established under the Wildlife Protection Act, 1972 which consolidated all the state game departments in Peninsular Malaysia. As of 2006, the department is placed under the purview of Malaysian Ministry of Natural Resources and the Environment. It is headed by a director-general and that post is currently held by Dato’ Abdul Kadir bin Abu Hashim.

National parks in Sabah are the responsibility of the Sabah Wildlife Department and Sabah Parks while for Sarawak, it is under Sarawak Forest Corporation.

See also
List of national parks of Malaysia
Malaysian Wildlife Law

References

Sources

External links

Ministry of Natural Resource and the Environment
Sabah Wildlife Department 
Sarawak Forestry

1972 establishments in Malaysia
Malaysia
Government agencies established in 1972
Federal ministries, departments and agencies of Malaysia
Ministry of Energy and Natural Resources (Malaysia)
Nature conservation in Malaysia
Malaysia
National park administrators